Intoxication is the eighth studio album released by Jamaican rapper Shaggy. The album was released on October 22, 2007, to critical acclaim, but without major chart success. The album was re-issued in September 2008 to include additional tracks, remixes and music videos. Four singles were released from the album: "Church Heathen", "Bonafide Girl", which features guest vocals from Rikrok and Tony Gold, "Feel the Rush", the official single for Euro 2008 (which only appears on the subsequent re-issue of the album) and "What's Love", featuring R&B singer Akon.

Critical reception
David Jeffries of Allmusic said the following of the album: "Shaggy's last effort, Clothes Drop, was widely ignored in the States and only semi-accepted in the United Kingdom and Europe. In Jamaica and Japan, however, the album had serious legs, carrying the dancehall singer's career all the way to August 22, and the release of the "Church Heathen" single. Seeing as how his most supportive territories were Jamaica—the home of it all—and Japan—where they'll take their dancehall straight, no R&B chaser required—it made perfect sense for Shaggy to deliver a JA flavored tune featuring Jamaican Patois and references for the dancehall literate. That tune, "Church Heathen," took the dancehall world by storm, re-established the singer's footing in Britain, and began to make an impact in the States towards the end of the year That the United States would even pay attention is the biggest surprise since insider lyrics like "She a do the dutty dance to the Matterhorn song, And a say she get the ting them from Baby Cham" are hardly the stuff of "It Wasn't Me" or even his breakthrough hit "Oh Carolina". Still, the single has a riddim that's infectious, a Gregorian chant inspired chorus that's very clever, plus Shaggy in top form, pointing out all the pious church-goers he deals with back home with his usual crafty slang and humor.

While the album - his worldwide comeback hit - lands on isn't totally without its crossover material, with "What's Love" with Akon being the best example—Shaggy is more discerning than ever and makes sure the radio-friendly material is right in line with his skill set. The breezy "Bonafide Girl" with Rik Rok brings welcome reminders of their "It Wasn't Me" interplay, and while "Out of Control" could have come straight from the house of Jermaine Dupri, it's R&B-meets-dancehall stance feels natural, not forced. Even better are the tracks that fall firmly in the dancehall category. Besides the glorious "Heathen" there's the opening "Can't Hold Me," which finds the gruff vocalist working his quick delivery over a wonderfully crooked ragga beat. Conscious reggae, Sizzla, Shaggy, and Collie Buddz all make "Mad Mad World" a standout while "Wear di Crown" with Mischieve boldly declares itself "Big Yard Music" at the start and then delivers. With Intoxication, Shaggy has once again found that perfect balance of slick and streetwise, and added career-defining single number three as the cherry on top."

Track listing

Charts

References

2007 albums
Shaggy (musician) albums
VP Records albums